Angelic was a British trance group featuring Darren Tate, Judge Jules and Jules's wife, Amanda O'Riordan.

History
In 1999, when Judge Jules and Darren Tate launched their collaboration named Angelic, Jules was already a successful club and radio DJ. For Darren Tate, the project was the beginning of his musical career. Jules' wife Amanda was featured as a singer in the project.

The debut single "It's My Turn" was successful, reaching number 11 and remaining on the UK Singles Chart for 10 weeks. Instrumentally, the track was based on their previously-issued remix of "Change" by Sunscreem, slightly shortened and with new lyrics. The song was also remixed by Rank 1 and 4 Strings.

In 2001, the trio released two more singles, "Can't Keep Me Silent" and "Stay with Me", which also reached the UK Singles Chart. After that, the group split up with Jules and Tate both pursuing their individual solo careers. O'Riordan's voice appeared again in 2005 on the song "Without Love" by Judge Jules.

Discography

Singles
 2000: "It's My Turn" - UK #11
 2001: "Can't Keep Me Silent" - UK #12
 2001: "Stay with Me" - UK #36

Remixes
 1999: John '00' Fleming - "Lost in Emotion"
 2000: Plasma feat. Berri - "Do U Believe"
 2000: Lost Witness - "7 Colours"
 2000: Kayestone - "Atmosphere"
 2000: JBN - "All I Want"
 2000: Sundance - "Won't Let This Feeling Go"
 2000: Sunscreem - "Change"
 2000: Orion - "Rush"

References

External links
 

British trance music groups
English dance music groups
British musical trios
Musical groups established in 1999
Musical groups disestablished in 2001
1999 establishments in the United Kingdom